This is a list of characters from the visual novels Da Capo, Da Capo II, Da Capo: Girls Symphony, Da Capo III and Da Capo 4, fan discs produced based on these games, and adaptations which include anime, manga, novels, and drama CDs.

Da Capo

Original main characters

 (drama CD), Mamiko Noto (young, drama CD), Yūki Tai (anime), Reiko Takagi (young, anime)
Jun'ichi is the protagonist of Da Capo. The player assumes his role as a student of Kazami affiliated junior high class 3-1. While he loathes trouble and bother, he seldom turns his back on someone in need. Jun'ichi has the ability to utilize magic although he can only create wagashi at the expense of his body's calories, a trick taught to him by his and Sakura's grandmother. Like the other characters, Jun'ichi is affected by the unwilting sakura tree, from which he gained his power to observe the dreams of other characters. He is one of the two returning characters in Da Capo II  / Chō. Otome and Yume from Da Capo II are his and Nemu's granddaughters. Hoping to relieve the worries of his granddaughters from losing Yoshiyuki, Jun'ichi fuses with the sakura tree after Sakura Yoshino too. Jun'ichi's hair was light brown in the first season and black in the second and as well as the original game. He is unvoiced in all game releases except for the DVD-PGs and his first name is customizable in the original game.

 (PC), Sakura Nogawa (anime/P.S.), Agumi Oto (Circusland I/D.C.P.K)
Nemu is a student of Kazami affiliated junior high, class 3-1, and later enrolls in a nursing school. She is Jun'ichi's adopted sister, and is actually in love with him. She is jealous when any other girl shows Jun'ichi particular attention and uses 'accidental' violence to interfere in the perceived affection. She wears a bell as an accessory which was given to her by Jun'ichi when they were young. When her mood turns sour, she becomes excessively polite and antisocial, a condition that Jun'ichi calls . Nemu has a pen pal named "lovely burning", whose real name is Sayaka Shirakawa. Her ending is considered to be canonical as it leads to the Second Season and Da Capo II. In the second season, Nemu is a nurse-in-training; she and Jun'ichi get married at the end of the series. Otome and Yume from D.C. II are her and Jun'ichi's granddaughters. In Da Capo Innocent Finale, she can be either dead or alive depending on the route taken. The cause of the Nemu's constant illness is also revealed to be her wish to always be together with Jun'ichi which was granted by the sakura tree in a twisted sort of way. The best ending in Da Capo Innocent Finale is that she survives and, along with Sakura Yoshino, attends Jun'ichi's wedding to bless the addition of Kotori to the Asakura family.

 (PC), Yukari Tamura (anime/P.S.)
Sakura is the primary protagonist throughout all the series. She is a student in Kazami affiliated junior high class 3-3. She is Jun'ichi's elder cousin and was his first love. She is a very lively girl who, much to Nemu's dismay, shows great affection towards Jun'ichi. She is sometimes seen with Utamaru and understands what it says. While sporting a great love for Japanese culture, she appears to be more of the mistaken foreigner. She has an IQ of 180, but she's inept with kanji due to having grown up in America. She inherited their grandmother's magical abilities. Despite the passing of several years since she left, her appearance on her return was unchanged from what Jun'ichi and Nemu remembered. This was explained to be the result of her wish to the sakura tree to remain the same so that she would always be as Jun'ichi remembered.

She is one of the two returning characters in Da Capo II, where she is now the principal of Kazami, the school Yoshiyuki goes attends. She still has a childlike appearance despite being in her sixties. In the second season of D.C. II, Sakura is shown to be unsure of the continuing closeness between Yume, Otome and Yoshiyuki. She is revealed to be related to Yoshiyuki in an obscure way; he was created by the sakura tree which granted her a wish when she was lonely and needed company (and is in effect the son that Sakura and Jun'ichi never had). The dire effects of the sakura tree are seen to worsen over time as the town starts to experience a greater frequency of fire outbreaks. This greatly worries Sakura and Otome. In the end of the anime, Sakura fuses with the magic sakura tree to prevent it from withering and causing Yoshiyuki, her most precious wish, from disappearing.

In Da Capo Innocent Finale, she plays a great role in saving both Nemu Asakura and Jun'ichi Asakura from their demise. In Da Capo III, she returns to life 20 years after the incident at the sakura tree, but has lost all her memories. She grows fond of Kiyotaka Yoshino and Ricca Morizono.

 (PC), Yui Horie (anime/P.S.)
Kotori is a student of Kazami affiliated junior high class 3-3 and the school's idol. Through the power of the magical sakura tree, she can hear other people's thoughts, but she carefully hides this ability. She became close to Jun'ichi because he was the only one of the male student body who did not try to idolize her. In the anime's first season, she is Sakura's classmate. She is also the younger adoptive sister of Koyomi Shirakawa, Jun'ichi's homeroom teacher. In the game, it is mentioned that she was adopted into the Shirakawa family, and is the cousin of Sayaka Shirakawa from Suika. Jun'ichi and Kotori get married at the end of D.C.I.F. (Da Capo Innocent Finale).

 (PC/W.S.), Rumiko Sasa (after D.C.P.C.), Akemi Kanda (anime/P.S.)
Miharu is a student of Kazami affiliated junior high class 1-2. She became a childhood friend of Nemu and Jun'ichi after Sakura left, being one year younger than them. She loves eating bananas. In the original game, an android patterned after Miharu took her place after an accident rendered Miharu comatose. Having no experience of the real world beyond certain memories copied from the real Miharu, Jun'ichi was tasked by Koyomi to look after her. Like the real Miharu her enthusiasm often overrules her common sense, and Jun'ichi often has to get her out of sight when her circuits start to overload. As an android, her power sources include bananas, solar energy, and a spring motor that needs to be wound up periodically using a key inserted into a hole on her back. At the end of the game and the first season of the anime, the robot's life span runs out and she stops functioning, spending her last moments with Jun'ichi. Sometime after that, the original Miharu regains consciousness and is reunited with everyone.

 (PC), Yui Itsuki (anime/P.S.)
Moe is a student of Kazami senior high class 1-2; a gentle girl who is often seen throughout the series sitting on the roof at lunchtime cooking and eating Japanese steamboat dishes with her younger sister Mako. She is very knowledgeable about them and is often seen carrying a small xylophone. She speaks rather slowly and is very polite but can be dim-witted at times and can fall asleep anywhere at any time, even when she's walking. In the game, this was explained to be due to her constantly taking sleeping pills so that she can keep dreaming, through the powers of the magical sakura tree, of meeting a boy whom she liked but who died in a traffic accident long ago.

 (PC), Yuki Matsuoka (anime/P.S.)
Mako is a student of Kazami affiliated junior high class 3-1. She is a close friend of Nemu and is often concerned about her. She has a temper and Asakura is the person who most frequently makes her angry, but she still secretly likes him. She is often found quarreling with Suginami as he teases her. During lunch, she can often be found on the school rooftop with her sister Moe enjoying nabemono. She plays the soprano flute in the music club. She and her sister Moe are daughters of the local hospital director and they have a younger brother.

 (PC), Daisuke Kishio (anime/P.S.)
Suginami is a student of Kazami affiliated junior high class 3-1 and the school troublemaker. Although he is an excellent athlete, a top student, and good-looking, his eccentric personality causes most people to keep their distance from him. He enjoys teasing Mako and dragging Jun'ichi into various situations. In Da Capo II, he plays a similar role and is Yoshiyuki Sakurai's classmate. In Da Capo III, Suginami is Kiyotaka Yoshino's schoolmate. He is cheeky, mature and intelligent. He is the leader of school's unofficial newspaper club which makes him and Ricca Morizono's rival. It's said his family has run the unofficial newspaper club for more than fifty years. His existence in each era is shadow in mystery.

 (PC), Miyu Matsuki (anime/P.S.)
Misaki is a sickly young girl who stays at home, looking out at the world through her window, and Yoriko is her cat. In the game, the magical sakura tree grants her wish, and she possesses Yoriko's body, which transforms into a copy of her original body, but with cat ears. In the anime, Yoriko jumps out of Misaki's window to see the world in her place, and is transformed into a human maid resembling Misaki with cat ears. Yoriko develops a fear of people after an incident with some children shortly after she transforms. Her storyline details her efforts in settling in as a maid as well as slowly venturing into the outside world.

 (S.S./F.S./D.C.II. P.S.)
Aisia appears in the D.C.S.G. manga and the D.C.S.S. anime. A similar character called the  appears in D.C.F.S., with similar features and the same voice actor as in D.C.S.S.. Aisia came to Hatsunejima to study magic with Sakura's grandmother, with her hopes crushed upon hearing that she has already died. Although she has knowledge of how to use magic, her control of her capabilities and her judgment are, at best, erratic. She firmly believes that magic can and should be used for the good of all, something her own grandmother always practiced. Her presence and antics were mentioned in D.C.II, making D.C.S.G./S.S. part of the official timeline. She also appears as a character in D.C.II. P.S..

Supporting characters

 (P.C. onwards), Masumi Asano (anime/P.S.)
Classmate of Jun'ichi, Nanako is a young shōjo manga artist with a serialization published on a weekly shōjo manga magazine under the pen name of Ayako Tamagawa. She has trauma with goats as her drafts drawn overnight get eaten up by Bridge Yagi, a goat introduced since D.C.P.S..

 (P.C. onwards), Emiko Hagiwara (anime/P.S.)
Alice is a half Japanese, half northern-European. Having lost her parents at an early age, she lives with her butler, Seba, and several other helpers in a mansion on Hatsunejima. Incapable of speaking for herself or presenting her feelings, she communicates with others through her puppet . Philos gets the ability to speak for Alice through the power of the magical sakura tree. Having spent time in a circus she has exceptional reflexes, but she is unable to swim. She is also good friends with Miharu who is in the same class as her, and Aisia who came from the same region as she did.

 (P.C. onwards), Nami Kurokawa (anime/P.S.)
 Tamaki is the student of Kazami affiliated junior high class 3-1. A miko at the local Shinto shrine. She inherited her mother's ability to see into the future. She first appears in Jun'ichi's class as a transfer student, declaring him to be her fiancé. She uses her archery skills to prevent people from getting hurt in foreseen accidents.

 (P.C. onwards), Miyuki Sawashiro (anime/P.S.)
 Kanae is the student of Kazami affiliated junior high class 3-1 and part of a trio with Jun'ichi and Suginami, and a good friend of Kotori. While being a girl, she keeps up a male appearance to attend school under her grandmother's instructions. Only Kotori and several teachers including Koyomi know of her true gender. She is always absent during physical checkups to prevent her gender being found out. Originally only mentioned by last name in the first game as a sub-character with no dialogue.

 and 
 (PC), Ryoko Shiraishi (anime/P.S.) (Kanako)
 (PC), Kanako Hattori (anime/P.S.) (Tomoko)
Kanako, who is otherwise known as Mikkun (nicknamed after her brother  as she feels affection towards him) and Tomoko, who is otherwise known as Tomo, are Kotori's best friends, and are commonly known as "Kotori's advisers". Together with Kotori, they form a band with Kotori on vocals, Kanako on piano, and Tomoko on guitar.

 (PC), Naoko Matsui (anime/P.S.)
Koyomi is Jun'ichi's homeroom teacher, one of the faculty's science teachers, and Kotori's older sister. She is also a researcher at the Amakase Laboratory, and in charge of the Miharu android.

 (PC/W.S.), Rumiko Sasa (D.C.P.C. onwards), Haruko Momoi (anime/P.S.)
 Supposedly a cat who is often with Sakura. Sakura claims that she does not own Utamaru. Her appearance is rather unusual, and she typically moves by hopping rather than walking as cats do.

 (S.S.)
The next school physician in D.C.S.S. after Koyomi's marriage and resignation, he was an instructor at the nursing school which Nemu attended. He was responsible for the return of Nemu as the apprentice school nurse. While being part of the cause, he played a major advisory role for Jun'ichi when he was squabbling with Nemu. His sister started the rumors of Sakura's return in episode eighteen of S.S. as she also had blonde pigtails.

 (PC), Miyuki Ono (anime/P.S.)
Jun'ichi and Sakura's grandmother, she is half-Japanese and half-British. She was said to have looked young until she was about a hundred years old. She died seven years before the storyline of the original series, but often appears in Jun'ichi's dreams during Nemu's and Sakura's paths in the game. The magical sakura tree started blooming all year round after her death.

Since Plus Communication / Plus Situation

 (P.C. onwards), Natsuko Kuwatani (P.S.), Aya Tachibana (Circusland I/D.C.P.K.)
Izumiko is an alien dressed in a pink bear suit which is actually a protective suit. While appearing by projection to most people as a "beautiful, slender girl with long black hair", Jun'ichi could never see this image and only sees her in a pink bear suit. Stranded on Earth about 820 light years from home, she works part-time (amusingly, as a pink bear mascot) to support herself. Her name is actually only an alias, based on the names of the Japanese poets Murasaki Shikibu and Izumi Shikibu, and her real name is not known. Izumiko has no dialogue in either anime series but occasionally appears as a passer-by.

 (P.C.), Yumi Kakazu (P.S./F.S.)
A mysterious girl who only appears for one night in the game, forced by Suginami to go ghost-hunting with Jun'ichi in Kazami Academy. Like Mako she is a tomboy and also easily frightened. She is looking for the spirit of her younger sister Asumi who supposedly died in a traffic accident. Actually, she is the one who had died in said accident, and finally departs this world after being told so by Asumi. She appears in D.C.F.S. as a sub-character.

 (P.C.), Misato Fukuen (P.S./F.S.)
Kasumi's younger sister and much unlike her, Asumi is a gentle and quiet girl, and attends school in mainland Japan. Born with heart problems, she received a heart transplant from Kasumi when she died in a traffic accident, and has lived healthily since. After hearing of rumors of the ghost of a female student in Kazami Academy, she goes to Hatsunejima to see if it was related to her elder sister.

 (P.C. onwards), Shigenori Sōya (anime/P.S.)
Butler of the Tsukishiro family, he takes care of Alice. Suginami calls him Sebastian, and is one of the few character he respects hearing that Seba was once in the special forces.

Da Capo II

Main characters

, Rina Misaki (young) / Shintarō Asanuma, Shizuka Itō (young)
Yoshiyuki is the protagonist of Da Capo II as the student of Kazami affiliated junior high class 3-3. The son Sakura and Jun'ichi never had, brought into existence by the new unwilting sakura tree. His name refers to this as well as it can be taken to mean "Yoshiyuki born from within Sakura". Like Jun'ichi, Yoshiyuki can create wagashi with magic. He also appears to be able to see either the future or peoples desires and dreams when he himself is asleep, as shown when at the beginning of a couple episodes in the anime version where it shows a dream he is sharing with someone and later when the actual event occurs and he recognizes the relation between the reality and his dream. In the anime, Yoshiyuki is depicted to be very caring about people around him. His actions as such frequently results in girls misunderstanding his helpful nature as signs of confession. Yoshiyuki is very insensitive to the people, especially the feelings of girls surrounding him. It is also not clear who he harbours feelings for even though he accepted Koko's confession and even dated her in the first season but later breaks up with her. In the second season, Yoshiyuki becomes closer to his two Asakura step-sisters Otome and Yume.

 / Ayahi Takagaki
Otome is one of Jun'ichi and Nemu's granddaughters. She is the student of Kazami senior high class 2-3 and the chairman of the student council. She refers to Yoshiyuki as "otōto-kun", meaning "little brother". Otome inherited her grandfather's magical abilities. Otome seems to be one of the two persons, besides Sakura, to have known that Yoshiyuki was created due to the a wish upon the Sakura tree. It is not clear whether Otome's feelings for Yoshiyuki are that of a brother or more but in the second season it was hinted that her feelings for him are greater than that of a brother. In the first season of the anime, Otome is portrayed as a caring elder sister to Yoshiyuki and also a very responsible council member in school, to the extent of falling sick in worries of matters regarding Minatsu. In the second season of the anime, Otome is shown to be very reserved when she was young only to become more open with the help of Yoshiyuki. They then share a promise to be whole-heartedly together. Otome is seen to care very much for Yoshiyuki and his daily affairs. This is shown when Yoshiyuki has an upcoming play where he is to play the main character. She forced Yoshiyuki to practice with her every night just to perfect his skills. Otome describes herself as a 'Magician of Justice' and has overwhelming passion to uphold what is right and what is wrong. However, Otome is shown to be very emotional in her part. This is depicted when she replaces Koko as the female lead in the Puppet show where she cried while acting out her role. In the Otome's route in the game, Otome and Yoshiyuki get married and have a daughter named Yuuki.

 / Yui Horie
Yume is the student of Kazami affiliated junior high class 2-1. She is Otome's younger sister, and one of Jun'ichi and Nemu's granddaughters. Her first name literally means "dream." Due to her magician blood, she sees the future in her dreams. In the first season of the anime, Yume's accommodating personality is portrayed when she easily became friends with Minatsu. Yume is also there to support Minatsu in times of trouble and also show signs of defensiveness towards Minatsu when others found out about the latter being a robot. In the second season of the anime, Yume is depicted to be rather lonely after Minatsu leaves the school. However, she puts on an independent front when in front of others, especially around Yoshiyuki. Yume is also shown to harbor romantic feelings for Yoshiyuki and is shown on a few occasions to convey her feelings indirectly by asking Yoshiyuki out. However, Yoshiyuki does not seem to know about it. When Yoshiyuki first came to stay at the Asakuras' place when he was young, the younger Yume is shown to be very open in her feelings and immediately grab Yoshiyuki's hands to introduce herself.

 / Minori Chihara
Nanaka is the student of Kazami affiliated junior high class 3-2, the school idol, and Kotori Shirakawa's granddaughter from Jun'ichi. She likes singing, but not in front of others. Nanaka is the lead singer of the school band together with Koko her childhood and her best friend who places the bass. Like Kotori in the previous game, she has the power to read minds (due to a wish granted by the magical sakura tree), but only when she is touching the person whose mind she wants to read. She starts to fall in love with Yoshiyuki when he starts being genuinely worried about her and helps her when she is picked on by other girls for playing with guys' feelings (even though those are just jealous rumors), but later she finds out he was worried about her not because he liked her, but because he saw her as a good friend. In the manga, she rents a room at Yoshiyuki's household and tries to capture his affections.

 / Sayaka Aoki
Minatsu is the student of Kazami affiliated junior high class 2-1, a robot who runs on bananas, but claims to hate them. She is upset over the fact that she is a robot but does not have a rocket punch. Like the android Miharu from 'Da Capo', one of her power sources is a spring motor that needs to be wound periodically (also with a key inserted into a hole on her back), though doing so causes Minatsu to experience a sensation similar to Sexual arousal. In the first season of the anime, Minatsu is friends with Yume. She also claims to hate humans in the beginning stages of the anime but starts to fully understand that not all humans are like that. After the school finds out that she is a robot, people became wary of her. Although she acts as if nothing has happened, in reality she is really depressed about the matter. Subsequently, the school became impressed with her courage and determination and the whole school even pleads for the school to not expel her. However, she was expelled but gets to attend a graduation ceremony arranged by the Students' Council. She was touched by the actions of Yoshiyuki and the others and graduates in a high note. In the second season of the anime, it is not known where she went. However, in the visual novel's Minatsu route, she decides to return to sleep then she wakes to a time when robots and humans have a more amicable relationship. Two years and a few months later she regains consciousness and is finally able to attend school on a trial set up by society for robot integration.

The robot Minatsu is a recurring character in Da Capo III where she works at Amakase Detective Agency, with Yuzu and Yuuhi as employees, and meeting Kiyotaka Yoshino.

 / Tae Okajima
Anzu is the student of Kazami affiliated junior high class 3-3. Due to a wish granted by the magical sakura tree, she has the power to never forget anything, thus having a strong memory. In the game, it is revealed that this ability puts a strain on her mind, thus she is often found sleeping in class, and, later in her route, she collapses from the strain and is forced to stay home to rest, with Yoshiyuki taking care of her. In the anime, she is best friends with Koko and occasionally hangs out with Yoshiyuki. In the second season, it is revealed that Anzu was abandoned by her parents when she was young and was adopted by a kind woman who she addressed as grandmother. The latter subsequently died when Anzu enrolls in middle school. She starts to open more towards Yoshiyuki and seems to trust Yoshiyuki a great deal into revealing her family and personal background. She is shown to not want others, especially Koko, to worry by not telling the others her family background. In "Da Capo III Platinum Partner", she has a little sister named Sumomo Yukimura (雪村すもも).

 / Yoshino Nanjō
Koko is the student of Kazami affiliated junior high class 3-3, a childhood friend of Yoshiyuki and Nanaka. In the first season of the anime, she confesses her feelings for Yoshiyuki, which he accepts and they start dating, but later on in the first season, she breaks up with Yoshiyuki after coming to light that Yoshiyuki has been spending too much time on others, particularly Minatsu. Koko felt left out as a result and develop feelings of insecurities due to Yoshiyuki's insensitivity to her feelings of loneliness. Koko is shown to be weak and cries frequently when she was young. Only after much persuasion from Yoshiyuki, does she smiles. Koko also has a forgiving personality as shown when she has a quarrel with Yoshiyuki when they were young but forgives Yoshiyuki after he apologized. In the second season, she develops to become a more confident individual but still holds signs of weakness in her falling sick due to unknown reasons just before the puppet show where she is stated to play the female character.

 / Kappei Yamaguchi, Asami Seto (T.P.Sakura)
Wataru is the student of Kazami affiliated junior high class 3-3 and one of Yoshiyuki's male friends. He is part of a music band consisting of him, Nanaka, and Koko. In the game, he has a crush on Koko.

 / Yū Asakawa
Maika is a teacher in Kazami in charge of physical education. She is actually a main professor in Amakase research institute and Minatsu's custodian. The Mizukoshi hospital is also her family enterprise.

Since Plus Situation

 / Kaori Mizuhashi
Maya is the class chairman of Kazami affiliated junior high class 3-3. She once hated robots because of her father’s career and death until her younger brother Yuto is saved by Minatsu. In Plus Situation and Plus Communication, her story is expanded: she once had an older sister who turned out to be another robot built by her father, and she was broken hearted to have found out after discovering the broken body of her sister with mechanical parts showing (the robot serving as her sister was destroyed by an anti-robotics extremist, who was only given a light sentence for his actions, much to the outrage of the robot designers).

 / Natsumi Yanase
Akane is the student of Kazami affiliated junior high class 3-3. She, Anzu, and Koko form a trio of close friends and are often seen together as a group. She loves to tease Koko, especially with regards to Yoshiyuki. At the same time, she is a warm and caring friend to those close to her. In Plus Situation and Plus Communication, she is revealed to have had an identical twin sister named Ai who died and whom she still grieves for (but keeps it hidden with her happy upfront personality).

 / Shizuka Itō
Mayuki is the student of Kazami senior high class 2-1 and the vice-chairman of the student council and one of Otome's friends. In Plus Situation and Plus Communication, she is revealed to be participating in high jump events, and her ambition is to become the high jump champion in an upcoming track meet.

 (D.C.II. P.C.), Tomoe Tamiyasu (D.C.II Fall in Love) / Rie Kugimiya (D.C.II. P.S.)
Erika is a transfer student of Kazami affiliated junior high in the first year, and is recruited into the student council and becomes one of Otome's friends. She is introduced as "the first princess of a Royal Family in Eastern Europe" and thus exhibits a haughty behavior at first, especially towards Yoshiyuki when, the first time they meet, he bumps into her and accidentally gropes her breast (so much that she even refuses to address him as Senpai despite their respective year levels). When Yoshiyuki gets close to her, she reveals herself to be an alien from another planet; in fact she's the princess of that planet, and that her real name is Erika Focus Light. Her purpose of coming to Earth was to learn about life on Earth.

 (D.C.II. PC) / Ryō Hirohashi (D.C.II. PS)
Mahiru is Student of Kazami high in the first year, and she happens to be a ghost. She is an innocent, energetic girl. She claims to be an eternal first year (because she's a ghost) hence she addresses Yoshiyuki as a Senpai. In the game when Yoshiyuki notices that Mahiru is a ghost (revealed by Mahiru herself) Yoshiyuki accepts Mahiru's request to help her find a way to rest. (Mahiru wishes to go to Heaven but she still has some leftover regrets, thus she can't go.) In the end, Yoshiyuki goes out with Mahiru, and happens to fulfill Mahiru's wish on his own.

Supporting characters

 / Asami Shimoda, Megumi Nasu (D.C. III, anime) / Yuzu Miyashiro (D.C. III, X-Rated)
Yuzu is a young girl Nanaka befriends at a hospital. She is afflicted with a life threatening ailment that requires an operation, but she is afraid to have it carried out. She reappears in Da Capo III, as an assistance to Minatsu Amakase, with Yuuhi Takanahi. When Kiyotaka Yoshino arrives at their department with evidences involving the magical sakura tree, they help provide answers.

 / Kentarō Itō
Shin is Yuzu's father.

Yuzu's friend. She's a returning character in Da Capo III.

Myu
 / Sayaka Aoki (D.C.II. PS)
Mu is a maid-robot created by Maya's father.

 / Sayaka Aoki
Harimao is a dog-like life-form, and Sakura's pet.

 / Kana Ueda
A girl who accidentally collided with Yoshiyuki and kissed with him. Such event itself didn't boded ill, but this girl turned out to be shinobi who lives in accordance with her village strict laws. And those laws are says: "If you kissed, you should marry!". This is a secret character.

 / Kana Hanazawa
A little girl who lives deep in the forest with a funny parrot called Boto. She loves to paint the pictures, and makes money by selling them. Rino met Yoshiuki when he got lost in the forest and ran into her wooden house. She considers herself older than Yoshiyuki. This is a secret character.

Da Capo: Girls Symphony

Supporting characters

Ose's younger brother, a mischievous boy.

Takaki's friend and a professional photographer. He is curious about the sakura tree on the island.

Da Capo III

Main characters
The six main characters are students in the newspaper club at Kazami Academy.

 (anime)
Kiyotaka is the protagonist of Da Capo III and is a second year student of Kazami affiliated junior high class 2-1. He lives with Charles and next door to Himeno. He is the only male member of the official newspaper club. He wished upon the Sakura Tree to live his daily life as it is.

 (all ages, anime), Tsuna Serina (X-Rated)
Ricca is a student of Kazami affiliated junior high class 3-2. She is the president of the newspaper club and is the school idol. Her rival is Suginami who runs the unofficial newspaper club and it seems she holds quite a grudge against him. It is depicted that Ricca was Grandma Yoshino in a past life with Kiyotaka as her husband when they first planted the magical sakura tree over 100 years ago. She tells Sakura a story about her life as a magician.

 (all ages, anime), Shizuka Fujimura (X-rated)
Charles is a slightly carefree third year student in the same class as Ricca. She is Kiyotaka's cousin and is half Japanese. She is a member of the newspaper club. Kiyotaka often calls her "Lulu-nee" or "Ruru-nee". Like Ricca, Charles is a member of the student council. Kiyotaka and Charles live in the same apartment together.

 (all ages, anime), Kokoro Moriya (X-rated)
Himeno is a second student of Kazami affiliated junior high class 2-1. She is Kiyotaka's childhood friend, whom he views like a sister, and she is a member of the newspaper club. Often, she becomes jealous when Kiyotaka (who lives next door to her in an apartment building) is spending time with another girl more than herself. Her personality is depicted as prim and proper by Ricca. She has a crush on Kiyotaka and tries to get him to accept her feelings.

 (all ages, anime), Ryui Takanahashi (X-rated)
Sara is a transfer student in the same class as Kiyotaka. She is a stubborn, hard-working student who skipped one grade and is one year younger than Kiyotaka. She is a member of the official newspaper club. It's said she enrolled to Kazami Academy because of a future dream her parents have foreseen.

 (all ages, anime), Sayu Ayaki (X-rated)
Aoi is a first year student of Kazami affiliated junior high class 1-3. She is an energetic girl, but has a weak constitution. She is the youngest member of the newspaper club and is known to have several part time jobs. She also calls Kiyotaka "Onii-chan" sometimes.

Hatsunejima

 (all ages, anime), Mera Souma (X-rated)
Kōsuke is Kiyotaka's best friend and classmate also in class 2-1. He is a masochist.

 (all ages, anime), Arisu Kagami (X-rated)
Kōsuke's older sister and the student council president. She is a sadist.

 (all ages, anime), Mio Mizusawa (X-rated)
Unofficial staff newspaper girl. She respects Suginami more than anything in this world.
In D.C III Dream Days it's revealed that her surname is "Shirakawa"

London Chapter

 (anime)
The protagonist. A first year Preparatory Student at Weather Vane in his first year. In Class 1-A. A nice guy who goes out of his way to help people in need especially his friends. A Category 4 Mage who specializes in Dream-Seeing magic. He came to Weather Vane to watch after his adoptive sister Himeno as well as do research on a secret topic.

One of the main heroines. A first year Regular Student at Weather Vane. Preparatory Class 1-A Master. Category 5 Mage known as Lone Cattleya. Very early on shows interest in Kiyotaka and discovers that he is in fact a Category 4 Mage. She is very responsible and is seen taking missions from the queen. Is part of the student council.

One of the main heroines. A first year Preparatory Student at Weather Vane in her first year. In Class 1-A. She is Kiyotaka's adoptive little sister. Her family adopted Kiyotaka years before and raised the two as siblings. Is very close with Kiyotaka.

One of the main heroines. A first year Regular Student at Weather Vane. Preparatory Class 1-B Master. She is the student council president at Weather Vane. She is a kind older sister type of character who is very domestic, however she is awful at cooking.

One of the main heroines. A first year Preparatory Student at Weather Vane in her first year. In Class 1-A. A quiet and reserved member of Kiyotaka's class. She is highly intelligent, but lacks high magical power. She plays gnilruc a sport that mages play that is somewhat like golf and targets put together kind of.

One of the main heroines. A normal no-mage girl who works multiple jobs including working at the Cafe visited regularly by the rest of the cast named Flowers and several other ones including a few at Weather Vane. She comes into contact with Kiyotaka and becomes relatively close with him.

 (all ages), Yukiho (X-rated)
A first year Regular Student at Weather Vane. Preparatory Class 1-C Master. A distant relative of the Katsuragi family and both Himeno and Kiyotaka's childhood friend. Although on the student council and a Master is often portrayed as somewhat irresponsible and loves to tease the Katsuragi siblings.

 (all ages), Aya Tachibana (X-Rated)
A first year Preparatory Student at Weather Vane in his first year. In Class 1-B. Mary's faithful companion is always seen with her. Although appears to be a girl is actual a male. Often is made to apologize for Mary's mistakes or attitude. Is a reference to Sherlock Holmes' sidekick to Dr. John Watson.

 (all ages), Sora Haruka (X-Rated)
A first year Preparatory Student at Weather Vane in her first year. In Class 1-B. A reference to the famous detective Sherlock Holmes. Is portrayed as being an ace detective although is somewhat bratty and over confident at times. A member of the Detective Club.

 (all ages), Uta Kijima (X-Rated)
A first year Preparatory Student at Weather Vane in his first year. In Class 1-C. A very pompous and proud person. Often portrayed as boastful and full of himself (although most of the time he is just awkward).

 (all ages), Ran Tōno (X-Rated)
A first year Preparatory Student at Weather Vane in her first year. In Class 1-C. The faithful (and often scornful) maid of Ian. Often seen teasing or making fun of Ian, although she always keeps up a friendly and maidly attitude.

A first year Preparatory Student at Weather Vane in his first year. In Class 1-A. A close friend to Kiyotaka. He is a puppet master and is almost always seen with his puppet named Shiki. They act more like siblings then master and servant (or sometimes it seems like he's the servant). He is generally an energetic and fun guy who is pretty perverted. A member of the Detective Club. Sees Mary Holmes as his rival.

A first year Preparatory Student at Weather Vane in her first year. In Class 1-A. Although she is not a mage she is essentially treated as part of the class by everyone. She is the puppet of Kousuke, and refers to him as "master" however hardly treats him as such. She is often sarcastic and even straight up mean towards Kōsuke who she refers to with disdain at times.

The headmistress of Weather Vane Academy. She is slightly air-headed, but very caring towards her students. Seems to have a past with Ricca.

Da Capo 4

Main characters

 The protagonist of Da Capo 4. He is the older brother-in-law of Nino and he attends Kagami Academy.

The friendly and outgoing idol of the school. As one of the most popular students, she constantly turns down love confessions. She is interested in Alice in Wonderland and her name is a romanization of Alice.

Ichito's younger sister-in-law who is an honor student at school. Behind her good honor student persona, she actually has quite a devilish personality which she only shows to a select few. She is terrible at cooking. Nino has a liking for cats despite being allergic to them.

Sorane is the childhood friend who lives next door to Ichito and Nino. She acts as a caring older sister towards them and cooks breakfast for them in the morning. However, she isn't good at doing household chores.

A classmate of Ichito's who is mischievous and gets into trouble often. She thinks of herself as a love contractor with a high success rate. It's thought that she would be considered beautiful if not for her wild behavior.

A sullen girl who is usually alone. She is hard to approach because of her disinterested and silent demeanor. Sometimes she will quietly mutter an insult to someone but they are rarely ever heard.

Ichito's kōhai who is the president of the discipline committee. She is timid and shy but tries to be stern with her position. Miu often chases after one of the school's troublemakers, Shiyori. She doesn't like being at the center of attention.

Another kōhai of Ichito. Chiyoko is extremely free-spirited and happy-go-lucky to the point of being eccentric. Her motto seems to be to just have fun and be happy. Her stagename is CHOCO when she is live broadcasting.

References

Characters
Da Capo